4th Street is a street in Lower Manhattan, New York City, United States.

4th Street or Fourth Street may also refer to:

Streets
 4th Street Corridor, also known as Retro Row, in Long Beach, California
 East 4th Street (Cleveland), in downtown Cleveland, Ohio
 Fourth Street, Singapore, a road in Siglap

Places
 4th Street Food Co-op, a food cooperative located in New York City
 4 Street Southwest station, a light rail station in downtown Calgary, Alberta, Canada
 Fourth Street Historic District, several places listed on the National Register of Historic Places
 Fourth Street Live!, an entertainment and retail complex in Louisville, Kentucky
 West Fourth Street–Washington Square station, an express station of the New York City subway
 West Fourth Street Courts, an amateur basketball venue in New York City

Music
 4th Street Feeling, a 2012 album by Melissa Etheridge
 "Positively 4th Street", 1965 song by Bob Dylan
 Positively Sick on 4th Street, a 1993 album by the punk rock band the Humpers

Other
 Fourth street, the fourth of five cards dealt to a community card board in poker
 Piggy Tales: 4th Street, the fourth season of the Piggy Tales series and part of the Angry Birds franchise

See also
 Forth Street Works, a former locomotive manufacturing site in Newcastle, England